Mahathma Gandhi Memorial Model School (M.G.M) is a CBSE, New Delhi, affiliated (affiliation code: 930049) higher secondary private school in village of Ayiroor, Varkala under the ownership of Aykia Pradayini Trust. Principal is Mrs.Pooja S. Manager is P.K.Sukumaran. The school provides education from classes LKG to Class XII and also has a Pre School, for small children. M.G.M was founded in 1983. The school tries to provide education that will help the children to think independently and prepare the children for the future. M.G.M school tries to bring to students education that is both stimulating and rewarding. The school consists of seven buildings – the Main Block, M.G.M International Kids' School, Play School and Preschool, Primary Block, Auditorium Block, SR. Secondary Block.

This School also has many digital libraries and computer labs with many computers and other devices like 3d printers, vr zones etc. This helps the children to learn with advanced technology.

Gallery

References

External links 
 
 http://cbseaff.nic.in/cbse_aff/schdir_Report/userview.aspx
 http://www.indiastudychannel.com/schools/36500-MGM-Model-School-Varkala-Ayroor-Varkala.aspx Retrieved 12 March 2015.
 http://qcckerala.com/mgm/Test3/ Retrieved 12 March 2015

Schools in Thiruvananthapuram district
Varkala